Mauricio Martínez may refer to:
 Mauricio Martínez (boxer) (born 1975), Panamanian boxer
 Mauricio Martínez (actor) (born 1978), Mexican actor and singer
 Mauricio Martínez (footballer) (born 1993), Argentine footballer